Woodbine is a city in Harrison County, Iowa, United States, along the Boyer River. The population was 1,625 at the time of the 2020 census.

History
Woodbine was platted 1866 at the time the Chicago and North Western Railway was built through that territory. It was incorporated as a town in 1877. The town was named for the dense growth of the woodbine plant near the original town site.

Geography
Woodbine is located at  (41.737553, -95.705688).

Demographics

2010 census
As of the census of 2010, there were 1,459 people, 611 households, and 389 families living in the city. The racial makeup of the city was 98.8% White, 0.1% African American, 0.1% Native American, 0.5% Asian, 0.2% from other races, and 0.3% from two or more races. Hispanic or Latino of any race were 0.8% of the population.

There were 611 households, of which 29.6% had children under the age of 18 living with them, 51.2% were married couples living together, 9.2% had a female householder with no husband present, 3.3% had a male householder with no wife present, and 36.3% were non-families. 32.7% of all households were made up of individuals, and 20.1% had someone living alone who was 65 years of age or older. The average household size was 2.29 and the average family size was 2.89.

The median age in the city was 44.9 years. 23.2% of residents were under the age of 18; 6.6% were between the ages of 18 and 24; 20.3% were from 25 to 44; 25.7% were from 45 to 64; and 24.2% were 65 years of age or older. The gender makeup of the city was 47.8% male and 52.2% female.

2000 census
As of the census of 2000, there were 1,564 people, 647 households, and 416 families living in the city. The racial makeup of the city was 98.34% White, 0.06% African American, 0.51% Native American, 0.38% Asian, 0.13% from other races, and 0.58% from two or more races. Hispanic or Latino of any race were 0.70% of the population.

There were 647 households, out of which 27.8% had children under the age of 18 living with them, 53.2% were married couples living together, 9.4% had a female householder with no husband present, and 35.7% were non-families. 32.8% of all households were made up of individuals, and 21.8% had someone living alone who was 65 years of age or older. The average household size was 2.30 and the average family size was 2.93.

23.5% are under the age of 18, 7.5% from 18 to 24, 23.6% from 25 to 44, 18.4% from 45 to 64, and 27.1% who were 65 years of age or older. The median age was 41 years. For every 100 females, there were 84.4 males. For every 100 females age 18 and over, there were 77.6 males.

The median income for a household in the city was $30,083, and the median income for a family was $40,972. Males had a median income of $30,139 versus $22,589 for females. The per capita income for the city was $15,117. About 7.6% of families and 10.4% of the population were below the poverty line, including 14.1% of those under age 18 and 6.0% of those age 65 or over.

Education
Woodbine Community School District operates public schools.

Culture
The Harrison County Genealogical Society is headquartered in a one-room schoolhouse, Merry Brook School Museum, built in the 1870s.

Woodbine is known for its annual Applefest, held the last Saturday of September since 1988.

References

External links
 City website

 
Cities in Harrison County, Iowa
Cities in Iowa